K47DR was a low-power television station in Farmington, New Mexico, broadcasting locally in analog on UHF channel 47 as an affiliate of Trinity Broadcasting Network (TBN). Founded June 4, 1990, the station was owned by Christian Broadcasting Communications.

In addition to TBN programming, the station also featured programming from Golden Eagle Broadcasting and aired locally produced programming as well.

The station's license, and that of translator K21HJ, were cancelled by the Federal Communications Commission on October 7, 2014 for failure to file license renewal applications.

References

External links
Christian Broadcasting Communications homepage
TBN official site
Golden Eagle Broadcasting official site

Trinity Broadcasting Network affiliates
Religious television stations in the United States
Farmington, New Mexico
Television channels and stations established in 1990
Defunct television stations in the United States
Television channels and stations disestablished in 2014
1990 establishments in New Mexico
2014 disestablishments in New Mexico
47DR